George Edward King (November 3, 1851, Macon, Georgia - Mar 1934, Atlanta) was a prominent Atlanta hardware mogul. He made his fortune building up the King Hardware Company. He bought up at least four major competitors from the first decade of the 1900s through the 1920s. King had his mansion in the Inman Park neighborhood of Atlanta.

References

 Franklin M. Garrett, Atlanta and Environs: A Chronicle of Its People and Events, 1880s-1930s

1851 births
1934 deaths
Businesspeople from Atlanta